Sergei Vladimirovich Ivanov (Сергей Владимирович Иванов; born 31 May 1972) is a leading Russian mathematician working in differential geometry and mathematical physics.

Education and career
For each of the three years, 1987, 1988, and 1989, Ivanov won a gold medal in the International Mathematical Olympiad. He studied at the Saint Petersburg State University, where he received his Ph.D. (Candidate of Sciences) with advisor Yuri Burago. Ivanov has worked for many years at the Steklov Institute of Mathematics. There in 2009 he habilitated (Doktor nauk).

In 2014 he received, jointly with Yuri Burago and Dmitri Burago, the Leroy P. Steele Prize for their book A course in metric geometry published by the American Mathematical Society in 2001.

In addition to his research on differential geometry, Ivanov also works on informatics.

In 2010 in Hyderabad he was an invited speaker with talk Volume comparison via boundary distances at the International Congress of Mathematicians. In December 2011 he was elected a corresponding member of the Russian Academy of Sciences.

Selected publications

References

External links
 Homepage at the Steklov Institute
 Ivanov, Sergei Vladimirovich; mathnet.ru

20th-century Russian mathematicians
21st-century Russian mathematicians
Geometers
Differential geometers
Saint Petersburg State University alumni
Steklov Institute of Mathematics alumni
Academic staff of the Steklov Institute of Mathematics
1972 births
Living people